Chovaye is an island that is a part of the Bajuni Islands archepelago in southern Somalia. in the Somali Sea. It does not have a permanent population, but rather only migratory fishermen. It is also called Tovai.

See also
Bajuni Islands

References

Islands of Somalia
Islands of the Indian Ocean
Somali Sea